Montserrat Abelló i Soler (1 February 1918 – 9 September 2014) was a Catalan poet and translator. During the Spanish Civil War, she lived in exile in France, England and Chile.

Translations

English to Catalan
A graduate in English philology, Abelló i Soler has produced a number of notable translations into Catalan of English writers and poets including:
 Sylvia Plath
 Dylan Thomas
 E.M. Forster
 Iris Murdoch
 Mohsen Emadi

Catalan to English
Abelló i Soler has also produced translations from Catalan to English of writers including:
 Salvador Espriu
 Mercè Rodoreda
 Maria Àngels Anglada
 Maria Mercè Marçal
 Olga Xirinacs Díaz

Written works
Abelló i Soler has also written a number of books of poetry: 
 Vida diària ("Daily life") (1963)
 Vida diària: Paraules no dites ("Daily Life: Words not said") (1981)
 El blat del temps ("The Wheat of Time") (1986)
 Foc a les mans ("Fire in Hand") (1990)
 L’arrel de l’aigua ("The Root of Water") (1995)
 Son màscares que m’emprovo ("Masks of Sleep that I Try") (1995)
 Dins l’esfera del temps ("In the Sphere of Time") (1998) which won the Gold Critica Serra prize in 1999.
 Asseguda escrivint ("Seated Writing") (2004)
 Memoria de tu i de mi ("Memories of You and Me") (2006)

In 2002, her poetry was compiled in Al cor de les paraules: obra poètica 1963-2002 ("In the Heart of Words: Poetic Works 1963-2002"), which in 2003 won several Catalan literary prizes.

She has also contributed to anthologies of writing and poetry:

 Cares a la finestra: 20 dones poetes de parla anglesa del segle XX ("Faces in the Window: 20 English Women Poets of the 20th century") (1993)
 Cartografies del desig: Quinze escriptores i el seu món ("Cartography of Desire: Fifteen writers and their world") (1998)
 Memoria de l’aigua: Onze escriptores i el seu món ("Memories of Water: Eleven writers and their world") (1999)
 Paisatge emergent ("Emergent Landscape") (1999).

Awards
 "Creu de Sant Jordi" (the Cross of Saint George) for her work as a translator (1998).
 "Premi d'Honor de les Lletres Catalanes" (Catalan Letters Lifetime Achievement Award) (2008).

External links
 Montserrat Abelló at the Association of Catalan Language Writers (AELC). In English, Catalan and Spanish
 Webpage devoted to Montserrat Abelló at LletrA (UOC), Catalan Literature Online) (English)

Sources
 Diccionari de la Literatura Catalana, 2008

References

Poets from Catalonia
1918 births
2014 deaths
Translators from Catalonia
Catalan–English translators
English–Catalan translators
Premi d'Honor de les Lletres Catalanes winners
People from Tarragona
20th-century Spanish poets
20th-century translators
Spanish expatriates in the United Kingdom
Spanish expatriates in France
Spanish expatriates in Chile
Catalan-language writers